Ahmad Q. Yusufzai was an Afghan field hockey player, who competed at the 1948 Summer Olympic Games and played in one match against Great Britain.

References

External links
 

Field hockey players at the 1948 Summer Olympics
Olympic field hockey players of Afghanistan
Afghan male field hockey players
Possibly living people
Year of birth missing